Bhamra (or “Bhamrah”, “Bhambra”, “Bumrah", "Bamrah" ) is surname. Prominently found in Punjab, Haryana and UP in India.

Indian surnames